Wadi Abdoun Bridge is a bridge in Amman, Jordan. The only cable-stayed bridge in the country, it  crosses the Wadi Abdoun. The building of the bridge commenced on 14 December 2002 and it was opened on 14 December 2006 and was built by Larsen & Toubro Limited, an Indian multinational company. It is part of Amman's Beltway project and links South Amman to the 4th Circle and Zahran Street.

Design
The bridge has three Y-shaped towers to make two equal main spans of 134 meters in length. The bridge deck is shaped like an S-curve to aid in connecting to the adjoining roadways and the stays form a harp arrangement. The project was delayed by one year due to its technical complication and few incidents during construction. The structural designer, Dar Al-Handasah, won a commendation award in 2007 from the Institution of Structural Engineers for this bridge.

References

See also
 4th Circle
 List of tallest buildings in Amman

Bridges in Jordan
Buildings and structures in Amman
Bridges completed in 2006
2006 establishments in Jordan
Cable-stayed bridges